MCP may refer to:

Businesses and organisations 
 Macapá International Airport (IATA airport code: MCP), an airport in Brazil
 Malawi Congress Party, a political party in Malawi
 Malayan Communist Party (1930–1989), an insurgent faction in Malaya and Singapore
 Molycorp (NYSE code: MCP), an American mining corporation
 Multispecialty community providers, a development within the English National Health Service
Mayfield Consumer Products, a family-owned business in Kentucky

Education 
 Master of City Planning, a degree in urban planning education
 Mission College Preparatory High School, a private Roman Catholic Secondary School in San Luis Obispo, California, USA
 Molecular & Cellular Proteomics, a journal published by the American Society for Biochemistry and Molecular Biology
 Monterey Coast Preparatory School, a private school in Santa Cruz, California, USA

Entertainment 
 Marvel Comics Presents, a Marvel Comics comic-book series
 Master Control Program (Tron), a computer character from the 1982 film Tron
 Mod Coder Pack, in Minecraft modding

Information technology 
 Burroughs MCP, a Unisys/Burroughs computer operating system
 Microsoft Certified Partner, an independent company that provides Microsoft-related products or services
 Microsoft Certified Professional, a certification from Microsoft
 Macintosh Coprocessor Platform, an outdated expansion card concept for old NuBus equipped Apple Macintosh Computers.

Medicine and biochemistry 
 CD46, also known as membrane cofactor protein or MCP
 Metacarpophalangeal joint, the joints at the proximal end of the fingers, commonly called knuckles
 Methyl-accepting chemotaxis protein, a transmembrane sensor protein of bacteria
 Modified citrus pectin, a form of pectin
 Proteasome endopeptidase complex, an enzyme
Metoclopramide, a medication to treat nausea and other problems from the digestive system

Science and technology 
 Manual call point, a common device for manual fire alarm activation
 Micro-channel plate, an electron amplification device used in physics
 Minimum convex polygon, another name for a convex hull
 Mixed complementarity problem, a formulation in mathematical programming
 Mode control panel, an instrument panel in some aircraft cockpits that contains the autopilot controls
 Monocalcium phosphate, a salt of calcium and phosphoric acid
 Multi-chip package, term used in semiconductor packaging technology

Other uses 
 Male chauvinist pig
 Makaa language (ISO 639: mcp), a Bantu language
 Minho Campus Party, a LAN party organized in Portugal
 Multi-currency pricing, a financial service allowing goods and services to be priced in multiple currencies